The men's field hockey tournament at the 1980 Summer Olympics was the 14th edition of the field hockey event for men at the Summer Olympic Games. It was held over a ten-day period beginning on 20 July, and culminating on 29 July 1980. Games were played across two venues in Moscow, at the Minor Arena at Dynamo Stadium and Young Pioneers Stadium.

India won the gold medal for the eighth time, defeating Spain 4–3 in the gold-medal match. Soviet Union won the bronze medal after defeating Poland 2–1 in the bronze-medal match.

Qualification
The original plan was for a twelve-team tournament, divided into two round-robin groups of six, with the top two of each qualifying for the semi-finals.

Group A

Group B

However, nine of the twelve teams withdrew as part of the U.S.-led boycott in response to the Soviet invasion of Afghanistan.

Argentina, Kenya, Pakistan, Malaysia, and West Germany boycotted completely, and while Australia, Great Britain, the Netherlands, and New Zealand competed in some sports, their hockey governing bodies pulled out.

The organising committee subsequently reduced the competition to six teams, the minimum required to hold a competition, with Cuba and Tanzania representing the Americas and Africa in place of Argentina and Kenya respectively, while Poland were invited as the next best team from the 1978 World Cup.

Squads

Results

Preliminary

Classification

Fifth and sixth place

Bronze-medal match

Gold-medal match

Final standings

 Spain

References

External links
Official FIH website

Men's
Men's events at the 1980 Summer Olympics